Professor Anthony Ivo (pronunciation: Eye-voh) is a supervillain and mad scientist in DC Comics. He is the creator of the android villain Amazo and, along with villainous scientist T.O. Morrow, the co-creator of the android Tomorrow Woman. As a result of his thanatophobia, Ivo has used his own scientific discoveries to make himself nearly immortal and invulnerable, but this has resulted in his appearance becoming monstrous in the process.

Anthony Ivo appeared in the second season of the live-action Arrowverse show Arrow and was played by Dylan Neal.

Publication history
Professor Ivo first appeared in The Brave and the Bold #30 (June 1960) and was created by Gardner Fox and Mike Sekowsky. The same story featured his immortality elixir and his most famous android creation Amazo.

Fictional character biography
Anthony Ivo grows up with thanatophobia, a deep fear of death so strong that he even avoids his own mother's funeral. As he discovers a talent for science, avoiding death and becoming immortal became his life's obsession. Ivo studies cybernetics and genetics, and eventually engages in criminal acts to acquire the resources he needs to continue his strange experiments. He concludes he could create an "immortality elixir" by studying and experimenting on animal life known to have long lifespans, and decides he will become immortal and dominate the Earth. To act at his agent in criminal operations and conquest, Ivo creates Amazo, an android built with "absorption cell" technology (later compared to microscopic nanite technology) so he can mimic the abilities of superhumans he encounters. Amazo stalks the founding members of the Justice League (except for Superman and Batman), then uses their powers to steal long-lived animals and kidnap an elderly person. Ivo creates and ingests his immortality elixir. Ivo then attempts to permanently remove the superheroes' powers and memories, but the League defeats him and his android. Ivo is imprisoned and given a sentence of 500 years in case his immortality elixir was successful.

The later story JLA: Year One revised Ivo's history to say that before he created Amazo he worked as a research scientist for the criminal organization Locus, which gives him access to advanced technology recovered from aliens and super-villains, and allows him to dissect the bodies of alien warriors from the planet Appellax who are able to shift their biology and cause other life forms to mimic their own forms. The story implies this research into advanced tech and the fluxing biology of Appellaxians is what helped Ivo create Amazo later.

Years later, Ivo discovers his immortality causes disfigurement that makes his skin scaly and his face monstrous. He blames this on the Justice League and becomes mentally unstable, leading to further criminal actions and attacks on the League. To keep him company, Ivo builds android duplicates of himself that eventually lock him up, repulsed by his insanity. The android then carry out Ivo's desire for revenge by attacking the newly reformed Justice League, killing new team member Vibe.

Later, Ivo builds a private island populated by robots and then discovers that his disfigurement is progressing, causing pain and increased immobility. Deciding he wishes to destroy himself but unable to do it directly, he creates Amazoids, versions of Amazo who can each steal one power. The androids take the powers of Red Star, Rebis, Valor, Power Girl, Starman and Geo-Force, then turn their abilities on Ivo but are unable to kill him. Ice of the Justice League sympathizes with Ivo, unknowingly invoked the power of Guy Gardner's Power Ring to cure him of his condition and restore his original human form.

Despite his disfiguring experience, Ivo succumbs to his death phobia and once again creates an immortality elixir, drinking it and accepting that once again he suffers a monstrous disfigurement, though now of a different nature. Deciding to target the Justice League again, he teams up with fellow mad scientist villain T.O. Morrow and they develop a friendly rivalry, bickering and trying to impress each other while also clearly respecting each other and enjoying their collaboration. They construct the android Tomorrow Woman, designed to act as a superhero to infiltrate the League and eventually kill them with an electromagnetic pulse that can disrupt brain functions. To Ivo's annoyance and Morrow's pleasant surprise, Tomorrow Woman becomes a true hero and sacrifices herself to save the Justice League. Discovering her true nature, the team then tracks down and arrests both Ivo and Morrow as they share a toast.

Years later, the time-manipulating android Hourman seeks out Professor Ivo to discuss the deeper nature of androids. In exchange for this talk, Ivo asks to know whether he will one day actually die. Hourman tells him but the reader is not privy to the answer. Ivo decides to meditate on it.

Professor Ivo returns in Infinite Crisis as a member of the Secret Society of Super Villains. Later on, in Justice League of America (vol. 2) #4, he attempts to create a new Amazo body that can be inhabited by the mind of the villain Solomon Grundy.

The Secret Society of Super Villains later assigns Ivo to collect soil samples in Auschwitz, Poland which will be used to create the Wonder Woman villain Genocide. He does not care to create the villain, but agrees to do so in hopes that the Society's resources can cure his disfigurement at last. Professor Ivo brings along his newest android Red Volcano as an aid.

Maxwell Lord later approaches Professor Ivo with a job to reprogram the Metal Men and to help Lord build OMAC Prime, an android who, like Amazo, can copy super powers.

The New 52
In 2011, The New 52 presents a reboot of the DC Comics universe. During the New 52 origin of the Justice League, in Justice League (vol. 2) #4, S.T.A.R. Labs Employee files revealed Anthony Ivo as a 37-year-old male who serves as Head of the Cellular and Structural Biology department at Ivy University for over a decade before joining and becoming director of the S.T.A.R. Labs project known as the Red Room (tasked with collecting and analyzing foreign, extraterrestrial and sentient technology deemed dangerous). Professor Ivo pioneers the "organic pattern process", technology that mimics organic life down to a cellular level, which leads to the creation of the A-Maze Operating System. A parallel support program based on Ivo's design, the B-Maze Operating System, is built without Ivo's knowledge. It has showed results comparable to those of A-Maze OS. The same files note that Ivo is unpredictable, disappearing for days at a time and often consumed by personal projects not authorized or approved by S.T.A.R. Labs. Ivo's thanatophobia manifests in panic attacks and drug use, and leads to several confrontations with Ivo's fellow team members.

Year later, Amazo fights and is defeated by the Justice League, apparently the result of further development of the A-Maze OS. Ivo fakes his death, then teams up with a mysterious villain known as the Outsider to establish a new Secret Society of Super Villains.

Powers and abilities
Professor Ivo is a criminal mastermind and a scientific genius, skilled in genetics, biology, programming, robotics, artificial intelligence, and engineering. According to JLA: Year One, he was able to obtain some of his knowledge and expertise by studying the technology and biology of aliens and super-villains. He is responsible for the creation of various artificially intelligent androids including Amazo and, with help from T.O. Morrow, the Tomorrow Woman. Ivo has intense thanatophobia, with the one exception being a short time when he believed suicide was preferable to increasing pain and immobility (though even then, his fear prevented him from attempting the act himself).

As a result of his immortality elixir, Ivo's skin seems to be invulnerable to conventional weapons, fire, and most forms of energy attack. It is not known if his aging has been completely halted, but Ivo himself believed his first elixir would extend his life for five hundred years and that he could consume more elixir when it wore off. The elixir presumably makes him immune to all disease and poison as well. Ivo has never succeeded in making a version that didn't cause disfigurement or mutation, and has never been able to remove the disfigurement without also removing his immortality.

Professor Ivo's Androids
The following androids were created by Professor Ivo:
 Amazo - Android capable of mimicking physical abilities, superpowers, and creating copies of weapons.
 Amazoid - Androids similar to Amazo, but each can only duplicate the abilities of one superhuman.
 Composite Superman - In one version of Professor Ivo's origin, his android Composite Superman is an early attempt to duplicate the Justice League's powers before later creating Amazo.
 Kid Amazo - The "Son" of Amazo, a techno-organic being created with Amazo technology and manipulation of human biology.
 Red Volcano - An android with great speed and heat-based abilities.
 Tomorrow Woman - An artificial life-form with telekinetic powers, artificial respiration and pulse, and false memories of a human life; co-created by T.O. Morrow and originally designed to infiltrate and eventually destroy the Justice League.

In other media

Television
 Professor Ivo appears in Young Justice, voiced by Peter MacNicol. This version is a member of the Light who is assisted by a legion of monkey-like robots dubbed M.O.N.Q.I.s and an android duplicate who is serving time in Belle Reve in his place.
 Professor Ivo appears in the "Vibe" segment of DC Nation Shorts, voiced by Jason Marsden.
 Doctor Anthony Ivo appears in flashbacks depicted in the second season of Arrow, portrayed by Dylan Neal. In his quest to find a sunken Japanese submarine containing the Mirakuru serum and to save his wife Jessica from an unspecified, worsening illness, he employed the crew of the ship, the Amazo, traveled to the island of Lian Yu, and rescued Sara Lance from the sinking Queen's Gambit yacht. While on the island, Ivo encountered the stranded Oliver Queen and claimed that he intended to "save the human race" before forcing him to choose between whether Lance or Shado dies by his hand. After killing Shado and losing his right hand and the Amazo to a crazed Slade Wilson however, Ivo started to suffer from blood poisoning and is eventually killed by Queen.

Film
Professor Ivo makes a cameo appearance in Justice League: War as a scientist at S.T.A.R. Labs.

Video games
Professor Ivo appears in a picture depicted in Lego DC Super-Villains.

Miscellaneous
 Professor Ivo appears in issue #1 of the DC Super Friends tie-in comics. This version intended to become famous via his robotics genius, but was overshadowed by the Super Friends.
 Professor Ivo appears in issue #10 of the Smallville Season 11 as a member of S.T.A.R. Labs. 
 Professor Ivo appears in the Injustice 2 prequel comics. After the League of Assassins kidnap his family, he builds a powerful version of Amazo for Ra's al Ghul. Upon learning from Jason Todd his family was murdered, Ivo retakes control of Amazo and allows the Justice League Task Force and Supergirl to destroy it. For his betrayal, Ivo is executed by Batman and Talia al Ghul's daughter, Athanasia al Ghul.

References

Fictional mad scientists
DC Comics scientists
DC Comics supervillains
DC Comics metahumans
Comics characters introduced in 1960
Characters created by Gardner Fox
Characters created by Mike Sekowsky